Daule, is a canton located in the Guayas province in Ecuador. Created in 1820, it is one of the most important parts of Guayas thanks to its rice production and other products such as corn and eggs.

The seat or capital of the canton is the city of Daule.

Demographics
Ethnic groups as of the Ecuadorian census of 2010:
Mestizo  51.9%
Montubio  36.1%
White  6.4%
Afro-Ecuadorian  5.2%
Indigenous  0.2%
Other  0.3%

References

Cantons of Guayas Province